William Irvine (February 14, 1820 – November 12, 1882) was an American politician, a United States Representative for New York's 28th district, and a lieutenant colonel in the Union Army during the American Civil War.

Biography
Irvine was born in Whitneys Point, Broome County, New York, attended the common schools, and moved to Greene County, New York, in 1841. He studied law; was admitted to the bar in 1849.

Career
Irvine commenced his law practice in Corning, Steuben County, New York. He was a delegate to Republican National Convention from New York, 1856.

Elected to the United States House of Representatives in 1858 as a Republican in New York's 28th district, Irvine served only one term from March 4, 1859 to March 3, 1861.

At the start of the Civil War he entered the army and assisted in raising the 10th New York Cavalry, of which he became lieutenant colonel on November 25, 1861.  He with his regiment served in fifty-five battle engagements from 1862 to the last conflict at Appomattox, Virginia in April 1865. He was brevetted to brigadier general on March 13, 1865, and was adjutant general on the staff of Governor Fenton in 1865 and 1866. After the war he moved to San Francisco, California and resumed the practice of law until his death.

Death
Irvine died in San Francisco, California, on November 12, 1882 (age 62). He is interred at Woodlawn Cemetery, Elmira, Chemung County, New York.

References

External links

1820 births
1882 deaths
People of New York (state) in the American Civil War
Republican Party members of the United States House of Representatives from New York (state)
People from Broome County, New York
Politicians from Corning, New York
19th-century American politicians
Union Army officers